Rothesay Herald of Arms in Ordinary is a current Scottish herald of arms in Ordinary of the Court of the Lord Lyon.

The office was created after 1398 when the dukedom of Rothesay was conferred on David, eldest son of King Robert III, on 28 April 1398.  This was the first ducal creation ever granted in Scotland.

The badge of office is Two fleurs-de-lys Gules surmounted of a three point label chequy Azure and Argent and ensigned of the Crown of Scotland Proper.

The office is currently held by Liam Devlin.

Holders of the office

See also
Officer of Arms
Herald
Court of the Lord Lyon
Heraldry Society of Scotland

References

External links
The Court of the Lord Lyon



Court of the Lord Lyon
Offices of arms